Ardheslaig is a crofting settlement at the northern end of the Applecross peninsula in the Scottish Highlands. It is described as a "widely dispersed group of houses around the head of an inlet" to the loch and has no shops or local services.

Ardheslaig lies on the Applecross coast road from Shieldaig which was completed in 1975, allowing access to the peninsula along a low level route rather than via the Bealach na Bà mountain pass. Before the completion of the coast road there was limited vehicle access to Ardheslaig and other crofting townships along the north coast of the peninsula.

References

External links
 Ian McLean's Holiday Memories, Applecross Historical Society Newsletter, January 2011, pp. 4–7.

Populated places in Ross and Cromarty